The Mitchell River National Park is a national park located in the Gippsland region of Victoria, Australia. The northern portion of the park may be accessed via .

Mitchell River
The park's central feature is the Mitchell River, which is the largest unregulated river in Victoria and provides a unique example of riparian ecology.

According to a Land Conservation Council Rivers & Streams Special Investigation completed in 1990, "It is an important example of the large-scale biological systems that were once widespread in south-eastern Australia." In 1992 the Mitchell River was listed as a Heritage River.

The park
The national park surrounds the spectacular Mitchell River where it has cut its way through rock strata creating high cliffs and several gorges.

In some of the gorges are found remnants of warm-temperate rainforest, the southernmost occurrence of this type of forest in the world. It can survive here as the steep walls of the gorges protect it from the annual drying summer winds and the bushfires that occasionally rage through the area.

There are recorded sightings of more than 150 bird species and 25 mammal species in the park. Vegetation in the park includes papery-barked kanooka trees, lilly-pillys, muttonwoods, ferns, mosses, vines, and lianas. In the drier areas, typical Australian species such as wattle and eucalypt dominate.

The Mitchell River was an important location to the Gunai/Kurnai nation, especially the Brabuwooloong and the Brayakuloong people of central Gippsland. One of the features of the park is the Den of Nargun mentioned in Aboriginal legends.

Gold was discovered in the area in 1857. Alluvial fields along the Mitchell River and its tributaries were worked into the early twentieth century, while there was also some reef mining from the 1860s. Later use by Europeans mainly involved timber and farming.

Den of Nargun
According to Gunai tribal legends, the Nargun is a fierce half-human half-stone creature that lived in the den, a cave under a rock overhang behind a small waterfall. In the legend the Nargun would abduct children who visited the rockpool. It was said the Nargun could not be harmed with boomerangs or spears, as they would be reflected back to the thrower.

The Den of Nargun was considered a special place for women of the Gunai tribe, being used for women's initiation and learning ceremonies. Thus the stories would have served the purpose of keeping children away from the sacred area, as well as keeping them near the campsite. The den was once rimmed with stalactites, but unfortunately these have been broken off as souvenirs by visitors over the years. This site was also of great cultural significance to the Gunai people, in particular the women.

Gallery

See also

 Protected areas of Victoria (Australia)

References

Further reading

National parks of Victoria (Australia)
Protected areas established in 1962
1962 establishments in Australia
East Gippsland